Zhao Fuxin (1904–1999) was a physics professor at Xi'an Jiaotong University. He was born in Shanghai. He was a member of Chinese Communist Party. Zhao graduated from Nanyang Public School (Predecessor of Xi'an Jiaotong University) Department of Electrical Engineering.

References

1904 births
1999 deaths
Physicists from Shanghai
Xi'an Jiaotong University alumni
Academic staff of Xi'an Jiaotong University
Educators from Shanghai